The Core Shopping Centre may refer to:

 The CORE Shopping Centre in Calgary, Alberta, Canada
 The re-branded Schofields (department store) in Leeds, United Kingdom